The 1998 United States embassy bombings were attacks that occurred on August 7, 1998. More than 200 people were killed in nearly simultaneous truck bomb explosions in two East African cities, one at the United States Embassy in Dar es Salaam, Tanzania, the other at the United States Embassy in Nairobi, Kenya.

Fazul Abdullah Mohammed and Abdullah Ahmed Abdullah were credited with being the masterminds behind the bombings.

Motivation and preparation
The bombings are widely believed to have been revenge for U.S. involvement in the extradition, and alleged torture, of four members of Egyptian Islamic Jihad (EIJ) who had been arrested in Albania in the two months prior to the attacks for a series of murders in Egypt. Between June and July, Ahmad Isma'il 'Uthman Saleh, Ahmad Ibrahim al-Sayyid al-Naggar, Shawqi Salama Mustafa Atiya and Mohamed Hassan Tita were all renditioned from Albania to Egypt, with the co-operation of the United States; the four men were accused of participating in the assassination of Rifaat el-Mahgoub, as well as a later plot against the Khan el-Khalili market in Cairo. The following month, a communique was issued warning the United States that a "response" was being prepared to "repay" them for their interference. However, the 9/11 Commission Report claims that preparations began shortly after bin Laden issued his February 1998 fatwa.

According to journalist Lawrence Wright, the Nairobi operation was named after the Holy Kaaba in Mecca; the Dar es Salaam bombing was called Operation al-Aqsa in Jerusalem, but "neither had an obvious connection to the American embassies in Africa. Bin Laden initially said that the sites had been targeted because of the 'invasion' of Somalia; then he described an American plan to partition Sudan, which he said was hatched in the embassy in Nairobi. He also told his followers that the genocide in Rwanda had been planned inside the two American embassies." Wright concludes that bin Laden's actual goal was "to lure the United States into Afghanistan, which had long been called 'The Graveyard of Empires.'"

In May 1998, a villa in Nairobi was purchased by one of the bombers to enable a bomb to be built in the garage. Sheikh Ahmed Salim Swedan purchased a beige Toyota Dyna truck in Nairobi and a 1987 Nissan Atlas refrigeration truck in Dar es Salaam. Six metal bars were used to form a "cage" on the back of the Atlas to accommodate the bomb.

In June 1998, KK Mohamed rented House 213 in the Illala district of Dar es Salaam, about four miles (6 km) from the U.S. embassy. A white Suzuki Samurai was used to haul bomb components, hidden in rice sacks, to House 213.

In both Nairobi and Dar es Salaam, Mohammed Odeh supervised construction of two very large,  destructive devices. The Nairobi bomb was made of 400 to 500 cylinders of TNT (about the size of drink cans), ammonium nitrate, aluminum powder, and detonating cord. The explosives were packed into twenty specially designed wooden crates that were sealed and then placed in the bed of the trucks. Muhsin Musa Matwalli Atwah ran a wire from the bomb to a set of batteries in the back of the truck cab and then to a detonator switch beneath the dashboard. The Dar es Salaam bomb was of slightly different construction: the TNT was attached to fifteen oxygen tanks and gas canisters, and was surrounded with four bags of ammonium nitrate fertilizer and some sandbags to tamp and direct the blast.

The bombings were scheduled for August 7, the eighth anniversary of the arrival of U.S. troops in Saudi Arabia during the early stages of the Persian Gulf War, likely a choice by Osama bin Laden.

When bin Laden’s bodyguard asked him after the attacks whether so many victims were really necessary, he replied referring to al-Qaeda’s 1996 and 1998 fatwas declaring war on America and Israel: “We warned the whole world what would happen to the friends of America. We weren’t responsible for any victims from the minute we warned those countries.” In the second half of 1999, Osama bin Laden spoke to a crowd of graduates from a training camp in Afghanistan about the attacks and explained the reasons for targeting the Nairobi embassy. Bin Laden said Operation Restore Hope in Somalia was directed from the Nairobi embassy and claimed the lives of 30,000 Muslims, the Southern Sudanese rebel leader John Garang was supported from there and it was the largest American Intelligence center in East Africa.

Attacks and casualties

On August 7 between 10:30 a.m. and 10:40 a.m. local time (3:30–3:40 a.m. EDT), suicide bombers in trucks loaded with explosives parked outside the embassies in Dar es Salaam and Nairobi, and almost simultaneously detonated. 213 people were killed in the Nairobi blast, while 11 were killed in Dar es Salaam. An estimated 4,000 in Nairobi were wounded, and another 85 in Dar es Salaam. Although the attacks were directed at U.S. facilities, the vast majority of casualties were local citizens of the two African countries. Twelve Americans were killed, including two Central Intelligence Agency employees in the Nairobi embassy, Tom Shah (aka Uttamilal Thomas Shah) and Molly Huckaby Hardy, and one U.S. Marine, Sergeant Jesse "Nathan" Aliganga, a Marine Security Guard at the Nairobi embassy. U.S. Army Sergeant Kenneth Ray Hobson II was one of the 12 Americans killed in the attack.

While Azzam drove the Toyota Dyna quickly toward the Nairobi embassy along with Mohamed Rashed Daoud Al-Owhali, local security guard Benson Okuku Bwaku was warned to open the gate immediately and fired upon when he refused to comply. Al-Owhali threw a stun grenade at embassy guards before exiting the vehicle and running off.  Osama bin Laden later offered the explanation that it had been Al-Owhali's intention to leap out and shoot the guards to clear a path for the truck, but that he had left his pistol in the truck and subsequently ran off.  As Bwaku radioed to Marine Post One for backup, the truck detonated.

The explosion damaged the embassy building and collapsed the neighboring Ufundi Building where most victims were killed, mainly students and staff of a secretarial college housed there. The heat from the blast was channeled between the buildings towards Haile Selassie Avenue where a packed commuter bus was burned. A large number of eye injuries occurred because people in buildings nearby who had heard the first explosion of the hand grenade and the shooting went to their office windows to have a look when the main blast occurred and shattered the windows.

Meanwhile, the Atlas truck that attacked the US Embassy at 36 Laibon Road, Dar es Salaam was being driven by Hamden Khalif Allah Awad, known as "Ahmed the German" due to his blond hair, a former camp trainer who had arrived in the country only a few days earlier. The death toll was less than in Nairobi as the U.S. embassy was located outside the city center in the upscale Oysterbay neighborhood, and a water truck prevented the suicide bombers from getting closer to the structure.

Following the attacks, a group calling itself the "Liberation Army for Holy Sites" took credit for the bombings. U.S. investigators believe the term was a cover used by Egyptian Islamic Jihad, who had actually perpetrated the bombing.

Aftermath and international response

In response to the bombings, President Bill Clinton ordered Operation Infinite Reach, a series of cruise missile strikes on targets in Sudan and Afghanistan on August 20, 1998, announcing the planned strike in a prime-time address on U.S. television.

The United Nations Security Council passed Resolution 1189 condemning the attacks on the embassies.

Both embassies were heavily damaged and the Nairobi embassy had to be rebuilt. It is now located across the road from the United Nations Office at Nairobi for security purposes.

A memorial park was constructed on the former embassy site, dedicated on the third anniversary of the attack. Public protest marred the opening ceremony after it was announced that the park, including its wall inscribed with the names of the dead, would not be free to the public. 

Within months following the bombings, the United States Department of State Bureau of Diplomatic Security added Kenya to its Antiterrorism Assistance Program (ATA), which was originally created in 1983. While the addition was largely a formality to reaffirm U.S. commitment to fighting terrorism in Kenya, it nonetheless sparked the beginning of an active bilateral antiterrorism campaign between the United States and Kenya. The U.S. government also rapidly and permanently increased the monetary aid to Kenya. Immediate changes included a $42 million grant targeted specifically towards Kenyan victims.

Opati v. Republic of Sudan

In 2001, lead plaintiff James Owens and others filed a civil lawsuit against Sudan for its role in the attack under the Foreign Sovereign Immunities Act with the recently-added 1996 amendments for state-sponsored terrorism.  They argued that Sudan was at fault for providing sanctuary to the bombers prior to the attack. The lawsuit was prolonged over a decade, hampered in part by the lack of Sudan sending counsel at times, but further struggled when the legal system ruled that foreign nations had sovereign immunity from causes of action in civil lawsuits based on the current language of the Foreign Sovereign Immunities Act in a 2004 case. Congress amended the Foreign Sovereign Immunities Act in 2008 to correct this and to allow its provisions to retroactively apply to existing lawsuits, including Owens' case. With that, hundreds more plaintiffs joined the suit, eventually with more than 700 parties listed. By 2014, the district court awarded the plaintiffs over $10 billion.  Sudan, which had not appeared during the initial lawsuit, appealed the judgment, arguing it did not understand the US civil suit system and did not understand the consequences of not appearing, but also challenged the retroactive nature of the 2008 change to the Foreign Sovereign Immunities Act.  The appeals court discounted Sudan's argument regarding its lack of understanding, and upheld the lower court's finding that Sudan was liable for the bombings, but ruled that the $4.3 billion of punitive damages could not be applied retroactively. The plaintiffs petitioned to the Supreme Court to appeal, and in May 2020, the Court ruled in Opati v. Republic of Sudan that the punitive damages could be retroactively applied, restoring the $4.3 billion that had been awarded at the District Court.

In October 2020, President Donald Trump announced that the United States would remove Sudan from the State Sponsors of Terrorism list, after they had agreed to pay $335million in compensation to the families of victims of the embassy bombings.

Indictment

Following the investigation, an indictment was issued. It charges the following 21 people for various alleged roles in the bombings. 20 of the cases have been resolved.

See also

 List of terrorist incidents in 1998
 List of Islamist terrorist attacks
 Terrorism in Kenya
 1998 World Cup terror plot

References

External links
Rewards for Justice – Most Wanted Terrorists
Transcripts of Sentencing Phase of Embassy Bombers Trial
Primer on the attacks
Summary of the Nairobi attack
U.S. District Court for DC finds "direct assistance" from Tehran, Sudan and Hezbollah in bombing
Oral History with Ambassador Prudence Bushnell to the Association for Diplomatic Studies and Training on the embassy bombings

1998 crimes in Kenya
1998 crimes in Tanzania
1998 in international relations
Embassy bombings
1998 murders in Africa
1998 murders in Kenya
1990s murders in Tanzania
Al-Qaeda attacks
Attacks on diplomatic missions in Kenya
Attacks on diplomatic missions in Tanzania
1998
August 1998 crimes
Car and truck bombings in Kenya
Explosions in 1998
Explosions in Nairobi
History of Dar es Salaam
1998
Islamic terrorism in Kenya
Islamic terrorist incidents in 1998
Embassy bombings
Mass murder in 1998
Mass murder in Nairobi
Presidency of Bill Clinton
1998
Terrorist incidents in Africa in 1998
Terrorist incidents in Kenya in the 1990s
Terrorist incidents in Nairobi
1998
1990s in Nairobi
20th-century mass murder in Africa
Building bombings in Africa